Carex pleiostachys is a tussock-forming species of perennial sedge in the family Cyperaceae. It is native to parts of the South Island of New Zealand.

See also
List of Carex species

References

pleiostachys
Plants described in 1906
Taxa named by Charles Baron Clarke
Flora of the South Island